

Boxing

International boxing events 

 May 8 – 20:  2022 IBA Women's World Boxing Championships in  Istanbul

Fencing

International fencing events 

 July 15 – 23: 2022 World Fencing Championships in  Cairo

2021–22 Fencing World Cup 

 November 19 – 21, 2021: WC #1 in  Tallinn
 Women's Épée winner:  Joséphine Jacques-André-Coquin
 Women's Team Épée winners: 
 November 19 – 21, 2021: WC #2 in  Bern
 Men's Épée winner:  Rubén Limardo
 Men's Team Épée winners: 
 December 10 – 12, 2021: WC #3 in  Saint-Maur-des-Fossés
 Women's Foil winner:  Alice Volpi
 Women's Team Foil winners: 
 January 14 – 16: WC #4 in  Paris
 Men's Foil winner:  Cheung Ka Long
 Men's Team Foil winners: 
 January 14 – 16: WC #5 in  Poznań
 Women's Foil winner:  Alice Volpi
 Women's Team Foil winners: 
 January 15 – 17: WC #6 in  Tbilisi
 Men's Sabre winner:  Sandro Bazadze
 Women's Sabre winner:  Caroline Queroli
 Men's Team Sabre winners: 
 Women's Team Sabre winners: 
 January 28 – 30: WC #7 in  Plovdiv
 Women's Sabre winner:  Anna Bashta
 Women's Team Sabre winners: 
 January 28 – 30: WC #8 in  Doha
 Men's Épée winner:  Yannick Borel
 Women's Épée winner:  Katrina Lehis
 February 11 – 13: WC #9 in  Sochi
 Men's Épée winner:  Valerio Cuomo
 Men's Team Épée winners: 
 February 11 – 13: WC #10 in  Barcelona
 Women's Épée winner:  Song Se-ra
 Women's Team Épée winners: 
 February 25 – 27: WC #11 in  Cairo
 Men's Foil winner:  Anton Borodachev
 Men's Team Foil winners: 
 February 25 – 27: WC #12 in  Guadalajara
 Women's Foil winner:  Alice Volpi
 Women's Team Foil winners: 
 March 4 – 6: WC #13 in  Athens
 Women's Sabre winner:  Anna Bashta
 Women's Team Sabre winners: 
 March 4 – 6: WC #14 in  Budapest
 Men's Épée winner:  Rubén Limardo
 Women's Épée winner:  Alberta Santuccio
 March 18 – 20: WC #15 in  Budapest
 Men's Sabre winner:  Áron Szilágyi
 Men's Team Sabre winners: 
 March 18 – 20: WC #16 in  Istanbul
 Women's Sabre winner:  Manon Apithy-Brunet
 Women's Team Sabre winners: 
 April 15 – 17: WC #17 in  Paris
 Men's Épée winner:  Nelson Lopez-Pourtier
 Men's Team Épée winners: 
 April 15 – 18: WC #18 in  Belgrade
 Men's Foil winner:  Tommaso Marini
 Women's Foil winner:  Anne Sauer
 Men's Team Foil winners: 
 Women's Team Foil winners: 
 April 29 – May 1: WC #19 in  Plovdiv
 Men's Foil winner:  Alessio Foconi
 Men's Team Foil winners: 
 April 29 – May 1: WC #20 in  Tauberbischofsheim
 Women's Foil winner:  Lee Kiefer
 Women's Team Foil winners: 
 April 29 – May 1: WC #21 in  Cairo
 Men's Épée winner:  Yannick Borel
 Women's Épée winner:  Choi In-jeong
 May 6 – 8: WC #22 in  Madrid
 Men's Sabre winner:  Oh Sang-uk
 Men's Team Sabre winners: 
 May 6 – 8: WC #23 in  Hammamet
 Women's Sabre winner:  Misaki Emura
 Women's Team Sabre winners: 
 May 12 – 14: WC #24 in  Heidenheim an der Brenz
 Men's Épée winner:  Romain Cannone
 Men's Team Épée winners: 
 May 13 – 15: WC #25 in  Incheon
 Men's Foil winner:  Tommaso Marini
 Women's Foil winner:  Lee Kiefer
 May 20 – 22: WC #26 in  Padua
 Men's Sabre winner:  Áron Szilágyi
 Women's Sabre winner:  Anna Bashta
 May 27 – 29: WC #27 in  Katowice
 Women's Épée winner:  Choi In-jeong
 Women's Team Épée winners: 
 May 27 – 29: WC #28 in  Tbilisi
 Men's Épée winner:  Volodymyr Stankevych
 Men's Team Épée winners:

Judo 

 August 7 – 14: 2022 World Judo Championships in  Tashkent

Judo World Tour 

 January 28 – 30:  2022 Judo Grand Prix Almada
 Extra-lightweight winners:  Lee Ha-rim (m) /  Catarina Costa (f)
 Half-lightweight winners:  Denis Vieru (m) /  Distria Krasniqi (f)
 Lightweight winners:  Murodjon Yuldoshev (m) /  Rafaela Silva (f)
 Half-middleweight winners:  Matthias Casse (m) /  Joanne van Lieshout (f)
 Middleweight winners:  Jesper Smink (m) /  Lara Cvjetko (f)
 Half-heavyweight winners:  Jorge Fonseca (m) /  Yoon Hyun-ji (f)
 Heavyweight winners:  Kim Min-jong (m) /  Kim Ha-yun (f)
 February 5 & 6:  2022 Judo Grand Slam Paris
 Extra-lightweight winners:  Ryuju Nagayama (m) /  Natsumi Tsunoda (f)
 Half-lightweight winners:  Yondonperenlein Baskhüü (m) /  Amandine Buchard (f)
 Lightweight winners:  Lasha Shavdatuashvili (m) /  Haruka Funakubo (f)
 Half-middleweight winners:  Sotaro Fujiwara (m) /  Nami Nabekura (f)
 Middleweight winners:  Sanshiro Murao (m) /  Margaux Pinot (f)
 Half-heavyweight winners:  Toma Nikiforov (m) /  Audrey Tcheuméo (f)
 Heavyweight winners:  Odkhüügiin Tsetsentsengel (m) /  Wakaba Tomita (f)
 February 17 – 19:  2022 Judo Grand Slam Tel Aviv
 Extra-lightweight winners:  Artem Lesiuk (m) /  Shirine Boukli (f)
 Half-lightweight winners:  Baruch Shmailov (m) /  Astride Gneto (f)
 Lightweight winners:  Hidayet Heydarov (m) /  Priscilla Gneto (f)
 Half-middleweight winners:  Matthias Casse (m) /  Megumi Horikawa (f)
 Middleweight winners:  Mammadali Mehdiyev (m) /  Shiho Tanaka (f)
 Half-heavyweight winners:  Ilia Sulamanidze (m) /  Beata Pacut (f)
 Heavyweight winners:  Guram Tushishvili (m) /  Romane Dicko (f)
 April 1 – 3:  2022 Judo Grand Slam Antalya
 Extra-lightweight winners:  Yang Yung-wei (m) /  Ganbaataryn Narantsetseg (f)
 Half-lightweight winners:  Denis Vieru (m) /  Réka Pupp (f)
 Lightweight winners:  Giorgi Terashvili (m) /  Jessica Klimkait (f)
 Half-middleweight winners:  Guilherme Schimidt (m) /  Lucy Renshall (f)
 Middleweight winners:  Iván Felipe Silva Morales (m) /  Marie-Ève Gahié (f)
 Half-heavyweight winners:  Jorge Fonseca (m) /  Anna-Maria Wagner (f)
 Heavyweight winners:  Guram Tushishvili (m) /  Léa Fontaine (f)
 June 3 – 5:  2022 Judo Grand Slam Tbilisi

Judo Senior European Cup 

 March 19 & 20: Senior European Cup #1 in  Riga
 April 23 & 24: Senior European Cup #2 in  Dubrovnik

Judo European Cup 

 February 11 – 13: European Cup #1 in  Sarajevo
 Extra-lightweight winners:  Turan Bayramov (m) /  Gülkader Şentürk (f)
 Half-lightweight winners:  Ejder Toktay (m) /  Binta Ndiaye (f)
 Lightweight winners:  Michel Adam (m) /  Carla Ubasart Mascaró (f)
 Half-middleweight winners:  Arnaud Aregba (m) /  Sarai Padilla (f)
 Middleweight winners:  Martin Matijass (m) /  Lara Cvjetko (f)
 Half-heavyweight winners:  Enrico Bergamelli (m) /  Loriana Kuka (f)
 Heavyweight winners:  Vito Dragič (m) /  Valentine Marchand (f)
 February 26 & 27: European Cup #2 in  Warsaw

Judo European Open 

 March 5 & 6: European Open #1 in  Prague

Judo African Open 

 March 12 & 13: African Open #1 in  Tunis
 March 19 & 20: African Open #2 in  Algiers

Karate 

 May 25 – 29: 2022 European Karate Championships in  Gaziantep
 May 26 – 28: 2022 Pan American Karate Championships in 
 June 4 – 5: 2022 Oceania Karate Championships in

2022 Karate1 Premier League 

 February 18 – 20: #1 in  Fujairah
 Kata winners:  Enes Özdemir (m) /  Kiyou Shimizu (f)
 Men's −60 kg winner:  Abdullah Hammad
 Men's −67 kg winner:  Didar Amirali
 Men's −75 kg winner:  Abdalla Abdelaziz
 Men's −84 kg winner:  Youssef Badawy
 Men's +84 kg winner:  Hazeem Mohamed
 Women's −50 kg winner:  Moldir Zhangbyrbay
 Women's −55 kg winner:  Anna Chernysheva
 Women's −61 kg winner:  Alessandra Mangiacapra
 Women's −68 kg winner:  Irina Zaretska
 Women's +68 kg winner:  Nancy Garcia
 April 22 – 24: #2 in  Matosinhos
 Kata winners:  Kakeru Nishiyama (m) /  Kiyou Shimizu (f)
 Men's −60 kg winner:  Christos-Stefanos Xenos
 Men's −67 kg winner:  Steven Da Costa
 Men's −75 kg winner:  Daniele De Vivo
 Men's −84 kg winner:  Brian Timmermans
 Men's +84 kg winner:  Babacar Seck
 Women's −50 kg winner:  Yorgelis Salazar
 Women's −55 kg winner:  Anzhelika Terliuga
 Women's −61 kg winner:  Anita Serogina
 Women's −68 kg winner:  Silvia Semeraro
 Women's +68 kg winner:  Lucija Lesjak
 May 13 – 15: #3 in  Rabat
 Kata winners:  Kazumasa Moto (m) /  Hikaru Ono (f)
 Men's −60 kg winner:  Abdel Ali Jina
 Men's −67 kg winner:  Dionysios Xenos
 Men's −75 kg winner:  Abdalla Abdelaziz
 Men's −84 kg winner:  Youssef Badawy
 Men's +84 kg winner:  Taha Tarek Mahmoud
 Women's −50 kg winner:  Reem Ahmed Salama
 Women's −55 kg winner:  Anzhelika Terliuga
 Women's −61 kg winner:  Dahab Ali
 Women's −68 kg winner:  Elena Quirici
 Women's +68 kg winner:  Ayumi Uekusa
 September 2 – 4: #4 in  Baku

2022 Karate1 Series A 

 January 28 – 30: #1 in  Pamplona
 Kata winners:  Ryuji Moto (m) /  Gema Morales (f)
 Kata Team winners:  (Mohammad Hussain, Sayed Salman Al-Mosawi, Mohammad Al-Mosawi) (m) /  (Raquel Roy Rubio, María López Pintado, Lidia Rodríguez Encabo) (f)
 Men's −60 kg winner:  Danilo Greco
 Men's −67 kg winner:  Ernest Sharafutdinov
 Men's −75 kg winner:  Kilian Cizo
 Men's −84 kg winner:  Dany Makamata
 Men's +84 kg winner:  Ondřej Bosák
 Women's −50 kg winner:  Valéria Kumizaki
 Women's −55 kg winner:  Mia Bitsch
 Women's −61 kg winner:  Elena Quirici
 Women's −68 kg winner:  Lynn Snel
 Women's +68 kg winner:  Tatiana Zyabkina
 June 10 – 12: #2 in  Cairo
 September 23 – 25: #3 in  Temuco
 November 11 – 13: #4 in  TBD

Mixed Martial Arts

UFC 

The UFC promotional company has held a total of 33 events so far in 2022.

Bellator 
In 2022 Bellator has held a total of 14 events so far.

ONE Championship 

The ONE Championship has held a total of 32 events across the world in 2022.

Sambo
 April 21 – 23: 2022 European Youth and Junior Sambo Championships in  Tallinn
 May 27 – 29: 2022 European Sambo Championships in  Yekaterinburg
 June 2 – 4: 2022 Asian Sambo Championships in  Jounieh
 June 2 – 4: 2022 Asian Youth and Junior Sambo Championships in  Jounieh
 July 15 – 17: 2022 African Sambo Championships in  Yaounde
 July 29 – 31: 2022 Pan American Sambo Championships in  Puntarenas
 August 27 & 28: 2022 World Beach Sambo Championships in  Bat Yam
 September 17 & 18: 2022 World Masters Sambo Championships in  Yerevan
 October 14 – 16: 2022 World Youth and Junior Sambo Championships in  Panagyurishte
 November 11 – 13: 2022 World Sambo Championships in  Ashgabat
 November 26 – 27: 2022 World Schools Sambo Championships in  Tsaghkadzor
 December 3 & 4: 2022 World Cadet Sambo Championships in  Chișinău

2022 World Sambo Cup
 March 24 & 25: World Super Cup "Memorial to the SAMBO Founders" in  Moscow
 May 14 & 15: WC #1 in  Santo Domingo
 June 18 & 19: WC #2 in  Casablanca
 August 20 & 21: WC #3 in  Bishkek
 September 17 & 18: WC #4 in  Novi Sad

2022 European Sambo Cup
 February 11 – 13: EC #1 in  Minsk
 Women's 50 kg winner:  Kristina Karekyan
 Women's 54 kg winner:  Alena Kupava
 Men's 58 kg winner:  Tigran Kirakosyan
 Women's 59 kg winner:  Evgenia Pavlova
 Men's 64 kg winner:  Alexander Pshenychnykh
 Women's 65 kg winner:  Karina Cherevan
 Men's 71 kg winner:  Mindia Liluashvili
 Women's 72 kg winner:  Anastasia Filippovich
 Men's 79 kg winner:  Besarioni Berulava
 Women's 80 kg winner:  Nino Odzelashvili
 Women's 80+ kg winner:  Maria Kondratieva
 Men's 88 kg winner:  Vladimir Zhupikov
 Men's 98 kg winner:  Sergey Kuznetsov
 Men's 98+ kg winner:  Anton Brachev
 September 10 & 11: EC #2 in  Tbilisi
 October 9 & 10: EC #3 in  Kazan
 December 9 – 11: EC #4 in  Bucharest

2022 Asian Sambo Cup
 TBD in July: AC #1 in  Bali

Taekwondo 

 April 21 – 24: 2022 World Taekwondo Poomsae Championships in  Goyang
 May 19 – 22: 2022 European Taekwondo Championships and 2022 Para-European Taekwondo Championships in  Manchester

Wrestling

2022 Wrestling Continental Championships
 March 7–13: 2022 European U23 Wrestling Championship in  Plovdiv
 Freestyle wrestling winners: 
 Greco-Roman wrestling winners: 
 Women wrestling winners: 
 March 26 – April 3: 2022 European Wrestling Championships in  Budapest
 Freestyle wrestling winners: 
 Greco-Roman wrestling winners: 
 Women wrestling winners: 
 April 19–24: 2022 Asian Wrestling Championships in  Ulaanbaatar
 Freestyle wrestling winners: 
 Greco-Roman wrestling winners: 
 Women wrestling winners: 
 May 10–13: Wrestling at the 2021 Summer Deaflympics in  Caxias do Sul
 Freestyle wrestling winners: 
 Greco-Roman wrestling winners: 
 May 5–8: 2022 Pan American Wrestling Championships in  Acapulco
 Freestyle wrestling winners: 
 Greco-Roman wrestling winners: 
 Women wrestling winners: 
 May 17–19: Wrestling at the 2022 Southeast Asian Games in  Hanoï
 Freestyle wrestling winners: 
 Greco-Roman wrestling winners: 
 Women wrestling winners: 
 May 17–22: 2022 African Wrestling Championships in  El Jadida
 Freestyle wrestling winners: 
 Greco-Roman wrestling winners: 
 Women wrestling winners: 
 June 13–19: 2022 European Cadets Wrestling Championships in  Bucharest
 Freestyle wrestling winners: 
 Greco-Roman wrestling winners: 
 Women wrestling winners: 
 June 19–26: 2022 Asian U23 and Cadets Wrestling Championship in  Bishkek
Cadets (U-17)
 Freestyle wrestling winners: 
 Greco-Roman wrestling winners: 
 Women wrestling winners: 
U-23
 Freestyle wrestling winners: 
 Greco-Roman wrestling winners: 
 Women wrestling winners: 
 June 24–26: 2022 Pan American Cadets Wrestling Championships in  Buenos Aires
 Freestyle wrestling winners: 
 Greco-Roman wrestling winners: 
 Women wrestling winners: 
 June 27–30: Wrestling at the 2022 Mediterranean Games in  Oran
 Freestyle wrestling winners: 
 Greco-Roman wrestling winners: 
 Women wrestling winners: 
 June 27 – July 3: 2022 European Juniors Wrestling Championships in  Rome
 Freestyle wrestling winners: 
 Greco-Roman wrestling winners: 
 Women wrestling winners: 
 July 2–10: 2022 Asian Juniors Wrestling Championships in  Manama
Schools (U-15)
 Freestyle wrestling winners: 
 Greco-Roman wrestling winners: 
 Women wrestling winners: 
Juniors U-20
 Freestyle wrestling winners: 
 Greco-Roman wrestling winners: 
 Women wrestling winners: 
 July 3–5: Wrestling at the 2022 Bolivarian Games in  Valledupar
 Freestyle wrestling winners: 
 Greco-Roman wrestling winners: 
 Women wrestling winners: 
 July 8–10: 2022 Pan American Juniors Wrestling Championships in  Oaxtepec
 Freestyle wrestling winners: 
 Greco-Roman wrestling winners: 
 Women wrestling winners: 
 July 16–19: 2022 European Schools Wrestling Championship in  Zagreb
 Freestyle wrestling winners: 
 Greco-Roman wrestling winners: 
 Women wrestling winners: 
 July 25–31: 2022 World Cadets Wrestling Championships in  Rome
 Freestyle wrestling winners: 
 Greco-Roman wrestling winners: 
 Women wrestling winners: 
 August 5–6: Wrestling at the 2022 Commonwealth Games in  Birmingham
 August 10–13: Wrestling at the 2021 Islamic Solidarity Games in  Konya
 August 15–21: 2022 World Junior Wrestling Championships in  Sofia
 Freestyle wrestling winners: 
 Greco-Roman wrestling winners: 
 Women wrestling winners: 
 September 10–18: 2022 World Wrestling Championships in  Belgrade
 Freestyle wrestling winners: 
 Greco-Roman wrestling winners: 
 Women wrestling winners: 
 September 26-30: Wrestling at the FISU World Cup Combat Sports in  Samsun
 Freestyle wrestling winners: 
 Greco-Roman wrestling winners: 
 Women wrestling winners: 
 October 4–9: 2022 Veterans World Wrestling Championships in  Sofia
 October 12–14: Wrestling at the 2022 South American Games in  Asunción
 October 17–23: 2022 U23 World Wrestling Championships in  Pontevedra
 Freestyle wrestling winners: 
 Greco-Roman wrestling winners: 
 Women wrestling winners: 
 November 5–6: 2022 Wrestling World Cup - Men's Greco-Roman in  Baku
 Greco-Roman wrestling winners: 
 December 10–11: 2022 Wrestling World Cup - Men's freestyle in  Iowa City
 Freestyle wrestling winners: 
 December 10–11: 2022 Wrestling World Cup - Women's freestyle in  Iowa City
 Women wrestling winners:

2022 Wrestling Ranking Series
Ranking Series Calendar 2022:
 24–27 February: 1st Ranking Series: 2022 Yasar Dogu Tournament and 2022 Vehbi Emre & Hamit Kaplan Tournament in  Istanbul
 Freestyle wrestling winners: 
 Greco–Roman wrestling winners: 
 Women wrestling winners: 
 2–5 June: 2nd Ranking Series: 2022 Bolat Turlykhanov Cup in  Almaty
 Freestyle wrestling winners: 
 Greco–Roman wrestling winners: 
 Women wrestling winners:  
 22–25 June: 3rd Ranking Series: Matteo Pellicone Ranking Series 2022 in  Rome
 Freestyle wrestling winners: 
 Greco–Roman wrestling winners: 
 Women wrestling winners:  
 14–17 July: 4th Ranking Series: 2022 Tunis Ranking Series in  Tunisia Tunis
 Freestyle wrestling winners: 
 Greco–Roman wrestling winners: 
 Women wrestling winners:

2022 Wrestling International tournament
 January 20–23: Grand Prix de France Henri Deglane 2022 in  Nice
 Competition cancelled.
 January 26–30: Golden Grand Prix Ivan Yarygin 2022 in  Krasnoyarsk
 Final medals rankings: 1st place: , 2nd place:  Dagestan, 3rd place: 
 January 29–30: 2022 Grand Prix Zagreb Open in  Zagreb
 Greco–Roman wrestling winners: 
 February 17–20: 2022 Dan Kolov & Nikola Petrov Tournament in  Veliko Tarnovo
 Freestyle wrestling winners: 
 Greco–Roman wrestling winners: 
 Women wrestling winners: 
 May 12–15: 2022 Muhamet Malo in  Tirana
 Freestyle wrestling winners: 
 Greco–Roman wrestling winners: 
 May 27–29: 2022 Pat Shaw Memorial in  Guatemala City
 Freestyle wrestling winners: 
 Greco–Roman wrestling winners: 
 Women wrestling winners: 
 June 10–12: 2022 Macedonian Pearl in  Radovish
 Freestyle wrestling winners: 
 July 8–10: 2022 Grand Prix of Spain in  Madrid
 Freestyle wrestling winners: 
 Greco–Roman wrestling winners: 
 Women wrestling winners: 
 July 21–24: 2022 Ziolkowski, Pytlasinski, Poland Open in  Warsaw
 Freestyle wrestling winners: 
 Greco–Roman wrestling winners: 
 Women wrestling winners: 
 July 29–31: 2022 Ion Cornianu & Ladislau Simon in  Bucharest
 Freestyle wrestling winners: 
 Greco–Roman wrestling winners: 
 Women wrestling winners: 
 August 6–7: 2022 Grand Prix of Germany in  Dortmund
 Greco–Roman wrestling winners: 
 August 12–13: 2022 Ljubomir Ivanovic Gedza Memorial in  Mladenovac
 Greco–Roman wrestling winners: 
 August 19–21: 2022 Druskininkai Cup in  Druskininkai
 Greco–Roman wrestling winners: 
 August 25-26: Slavin, Halfen, Weinberg & Gottfreund Memorial in  Beer Sheva
 Freestyle wrestling winners: 
 Greco–Roman wrestling winners: 
 September 30–1: 2022 Thor Masters in  Nykobing Falster
 November 2–6: 2022 Kunayev D.A. in  Taraz City
 Freestyle wrestling winners: 
 November 5–6: 2022 Kristjan Palusalu Memorial in  Tallinn
 December 3–4: 2022 Haparanda Cup in  Haparanda
 December 10–11: 2022 Arvo Haavisto in  Ilmajoki

References

External links 

 International Boxing Association (Amateur)
 FIE - Fédération Internationale d'Escrime (International Fencing Federation)
 International Judo Federation
 World Karate Federation
 World Association of Kickboxing Organizations
 International Mixed Martial Arts Federation
 International Federation of Muaythai Amateur
 International Sambo Federation
 International Sumo Federation
 World Taekwondo Federation
 United World Wrestling
 International Wushu Federation

Combat sports
combat
2022 sport-related lists